The Oriental Museum, formerly the Gulbenkian Museum of Oriental Art and Archaeology, is a museum of the University of Durham in England. The museum has a collection of more than 23,500 Chinese, Egyptian, Korean, Indian, Japanese and other far east and Asian artefacts. The museum was founded due to the need to house an increasing collection of Oriental artefacts used by the School of Oriental Studies, that were previously housed around the university. The museum's Chinese and Egyptian collections were 'designated' by the Museums, Libraries and Archives Council (MLA), now the Arts Council England as being of "national and international importance".

History
Founded in 1960 to support the university's teaching and research in the Oriental School, the collections of the museum have largely grown through donations and purchases to support cultural studies alongside the teaching of languages. The museum's initial collection arose from the sale of the antiquities of Algernon Percy, 4th Duke of Northumberland, from Anatolia, Mesopotamia and Ancient Egypt. The collection arrived in late 1950 being initially housed in two rooms in Hatfield College. After a fire broke out in 1956 one of the rooms was returned to the college and much of the collection was placed in storage.

The establishment of Raymond Dawson as lecturer in Indian religions and philosophy in 1952 led to the collection expanding into the Far East. Initially Dawson organised a series of Chinese exhibitions from loaned items before the foundation of the Chinese collection came about from Harold MacDonald's promotion to High Commissioner of India in 1955. Having amassed a large collection of gifts and antiquities, from his prior role as Commissioner General for South East Asia, MacDonald was reluctant to relocate his collection from Singapore to India. Subsequently, Dawson was contacted by MacDonald and an initial five-year loan of the collection was agreed.

The growth of the school led to the school moving to Elvet Hill House, where the current location of the museum is set, on the south edge of Durham. With part of the collection still held at various sites and the success of the initial exhibitions potential donors were sought for the formal establishment of a museum. A successful bid was made to the Gulbenkian Foundation in 1957 with a £60,000 donation to fund the initial stage of the museum which was renamed the Gulbenkian Museum of Oriental Art and Archaeology in honour of the donation. The museum was completed in 1959 with the collections being transferred along with the bequest of 3,000 Chinese objects from Sir Charles Hardinge to the new museum by the end of the year. After the creation of the displays the museum was officially opened in May 1960 with a three-day week initially attracting c.100 visitors a week.

In October 1969 a fragment of Moon rock was sent to the university's department of earth sciences. Prior to undergoing analysis the rock was displayed at the museum for two days attracting over 12,000 people resulting in the museum opening until 8:30pm to accommodate the visitors.

During 2008 the Egyptian and Chinese art and archaeology collections were granted designated status along with 150 pieces from the collections touring Japan for nine months in the Oriental Art from Durham University and Eton College exhibition attracting over 185,000 visitors.

In 2012 thieves stole Chinese artefacts worth almost £2 million. The items were recovered by police and returned to the museum. In 2013 two men were found guilty of the theft and jailed.

Awards 
In March 2012, a national award, "The Bronze Hear by Right", was presented to the museum by the National Youth Agency.

Finances 
Subsequent to the Moon rock display, funding was sought to complete the second stage of the museum, however, such funds were not forthcoming and in the 1980s a competition was launched to add additional side galleries in lieu of the second stage. In 2000 further funding was secured to create a mezzanine floor to house additional artifacts from the collections.

In 2012, Culture Minister Ed Vaizey announced funding from the DCMS/Wolfson Foundation Museums and Galleries Improvement Fund. The grant, totally more than £80,000 will be used to help fund new galleries dedicated to Japan and Korea.

Collections
China: The Chinese collection contains over 10,000 objects ranging from the Zhou dynasty to the Qing dynasty included c.1,000 pieces of Chinese pottery, of which 400 are from the Malcolm MacDonald collection, and nearly 2,000 pieces of Jade and hardstones from the Sir Charles Hardinge donation.
Korea: Containing just over 500 pieces, the collection is one of the smallest with objects from the Goryeo dynasty and Joseon dynasty including bronze mirrors and ceramics with sanggam decoration. The collection is predominantly composed of the donations from Richard Rutt and Henry de Laszlo. Recent acquisitions of contemporary Korean culture and art have been made possible by the Stories of the World project and the Art Fund, resulting in the Korean collection encompassing the time period from 600 AD to 2013.
Indian subcontinent: Ranging from stone sculptures to Mughal jade and Gandharan sculptures the collections contains 1,500 objects, and over 5,000 photographs taken by John Marshall.
Japan: The Japanese collection spans mostly the Edo and Meiji periods of Japanese history but also contains objects from the Muromachi and Momoyama periods, along with a bronze Buddha head from the Kamakura era.
South East Asia: The collection is formed mainly from two acquisitions, the Harold MacDonald collection consisting of items presented to him as Commissioner General of South East Asia, and the Roberts Collection of Balinese art.
The Levant and Middle East: The collection contains many artefacts collected from archaeological excavations such as those from Sir Leonard Woolley's excavations at Ur, Kathleen Kenyon's at Jericho and the Lachish excavation. The core of the collection is from the Northumberland Collections consisting of seals and cuneiform tablets.
Ancient Egypt: Made up of over 6,700 objects the Egyptian collection is formed from two main acquisitions; The Northumberland collection of over 2,500, purchased from the Fourth Duke of Northumberland, and 4,600 items comprising the Sir Henry Wellcome collections. The collection includes an 18th dynasty funeral mask, and Shabti of Prince Bahmery along with a statue of the Vizier Paser from the 19th dynasty, reign of Ramesses II.

References

External links
Oriental Museum
BBC: A World History
Art World Online Catalogue
Catalogue of the 'Egyptian Art at Eton College and Durham University' Japanese Tour
Culture 24: Oriental museum profile
Treasures Of Oriental Museum

Museums established in 1960
University museums in the United Kingdom
Ethnographic museums in England
Buildings and structures of Durham University
Museums in Durham, England
Asian art museums in the United Kingdom
Art museums and galleries in County Durham
Musical instrument museums in England
1960 establishments in England